XHMAI-FM is a radio station on 95.1 FM in Mapastepec, Chiapas. It is owned by Radio Núcleo and carries a grupera format known as La Mera Madre.

History
XHMAI received its concession on September 3, 1994. It was owned by Juan Carlos Bravo Ortiz and broadcast on 97.3 MHz.

XHMAI moved to 95.1 MHz and increased its power with technical authorizations issued in 1999 and 2001. In January 2018, the station changed its image and became known as La Mera Madre.

References

Regional Mexican radio stations
Radio stations in Chiapas